The Adoration Stakes (formerly known as the Milady Handicap) is an American Thoroughbred horse race run annually during May at Santa Anita Park. The event is open to fillies and mares, age three and up, willing to race one and one-sixteenth miles on the dirt. The current purse is $100,000. The event lost its  Grade III classification since it has not been run since 2018.

History
The race was founded in 1952 as the Milady Handicap at Hollywood Park Racetrack in Inglewood, California. Usually run on the dirt, the Milady was run on an all-weather artificial dirt surface from 2007 to 2013. The race was renamed as the Marjorie L. Everett Handicap in 2012 to honor Marjorie L. Evereett, former chairman, president and CEO of Hollywood Park who died on March 23, 2012. When Hollywood Park was closed at the end of 2013, the race was moved to Santa Anita and renamed as the Adoration Stakes. The race was also changed from a handicap to allowance conditions, in which horses receive a specified reduction in weight if they satisfy certain conditions.

It was a Grade I race from 1987 through 2004, during which years it was won by several Hall of Fame inductees including Bayakoa, Paseana and Azeri. Zenyatta won the race in both 2008 and 2009 as part of her 19 race win streak. The Milady was a Grade II event from 1974 (when grading was introduced) to 1986 and from 2005 to 2013. In 2014, it was stepped down to a Grade III event.

The race has been run at a variety of distances:
  miles – 1967–1969, 1973–1984, 1986 to present
 1 mile – 1954, 1958–1966, 1970–1972, 1985
 7 furlongs – 1952-1953
 6 furlongs – 1955-1957

Records
Speed Record:
Image of Reality (1980) - 1:40

Most wins:
 2 - A Gleam (1952, 1953)
 2 - Adored (1984, 1985)
 2 - Bayakoa (1989, 1990)
 2 - Paseana (1992, 1993)
 2 - Azeri (2002, 2003)
 2 - Zenyatta (2008, 2009)
 2 - Beholder (2015, 2016)

Winners since 1989

Earlier winners

1988 - By Land By Sea
1987 - Seldom Seen Sue
1986 - Dontstop Themusic
1985 - Adored
1984 - Adored
1983 - Marisma
1982 - Cat Girl
1981 - Save Wild Life
1980 - Image of Reality
1979 - Innuendo
1978 - Taisez Vou
1977 - Cascapedia
1976 - Bastonera
1975 - Modus Vivendi
1974 - Twixt
1973 - Minstrel Miss
1972 - Typecast
1971 - Opening Bid (DH)
1971 - Street Dancer (DH)
1970 - Everything Lovely
1969 - Desert Law
1968 - Princessnesian
1967 - Desert Trial
1966 - Fleet Treat
1965 - Savaii
1964 - Jalousie
1963 - Fortunate Isle
1962 - Linita
1961 - Mountain Glory
1960 - Silver Spoon
1959 - Honey's Gem
1958 - Born Rich
1957 - Coverit
1956 - Speedy Edie
1955 - Countess Fleet
1954 - Flitting Past
1953 - A Gleam
1952 - A Gleam

References

 Hollywood Park official website
 The Milady Handicap at Pedigree Query

Horse races in California
Santa Anita Park
Graded stakes races in the United States
Mile category horse races for fillies and mares
Recurring sporting events established in 1952